Caixa de Aforros de Galicia, Vigo, Ourense e Pontevedra (trading as Novacaixagalicia) was the name of a short-lived Spanish savings bank based in Galicia. It was created following the forced merger of the two major savings banks in the region, Caixa Galicia and Caixanova. This new caixa for Galicia became the fourth-largest in Spain with consolidated assets valued at €78.1 billion, and fourth-largest in terms of savings accounts, with €108.4 billion - 6% of Spanish savings banks.

Due to financial irregularities in the finances of the company, in little under a year this new savings bank would go on to be "bankised" as NCG Banco.

As a side note, it was the first financial institution to be registered in the Galician language.

References

External links

Banks disestablished in 2011
Banks established in 2010
Defunct banks of Spain
Companies based in Galicia (Spain)
Spanish companies established in 2010